Agama boueti, also known commonly as the Mali agama, is a species of lizard in the family Agamidae. The species is native to West Africa.

Etymology
The specific name, boueti, is in honor of Georges Bouet (1869–1957), who was a French ornithologist and physician.

Geographic range
A. boueti is found in Burkina Faso, Mali, Mauritania, Morocco, Niger, and Senegal.

Habitat
The preferred natural habitats of A. boueti are savanna, shrubland, and rocky areas.

Description

Diet
A. boueti preys upon grasshoppers, ants, beetles, and other small arthropods. It also eats succulent plants.

Reproduction
A. boueti is oviparous.

References

Further reading
Böhme W, Heath J (2018). "Amphibian and Reptilian records from south-central Mali and western Burkina Faso". Bonn zoological Bulletin 67 (1): 59–69. (Agama boueti, p. 67, Figure 12).
Chabanaud P (1917). "Énumération des Reptiles non encore étudiés de l'Afrique occidentale, appartenant aux Collections du Muséum, avec la description des espèces nouvelles ". Bulletin du Muséum National d'Histoire Naturelle, Paris 23: 83–105. (Agama boueti, new species, pp. 85–87). (in French).
Mediani M, Chevalier F (2016). "Agama boueti Chabanaud, 1917: new to the herpetofauna of Morocco and the northwesternmost record of the species". Herpetozoa 28 (3/4): 187–191.

Agama (genus)
Reptiles described in 1917
Taxa named by Paul Chabanaud